Termes may refer to:

People
 Dick Termes, American artist
 Josep Termes (1936–2011), Spanish historian
 Rafael Termes (1918–2005), Spanish banker

Places

Belgium
 Termes, Wallonia, a district of the municipality of Chiny

France
 Termes, Ardennes, now part of Grandpré
 Termes, Aude
 Château de Termes, a ruined castle near Termes, Aude
 Termes, Lozère
 Termes-d'Armagnac, in the Gers department 
 Château de Thibault de Termes, a Medieval castle in Termes-d'Armagnac, Gers

Spain
 Termantia, an archaeological site on the edge of the Duero valley

Other uses 
 Termes (insect), a genus of higher termites
 TERMES robots, a robotics project from Harvard University

See also
 Termez, Uzbekistan